National Highway 61 (NH 61) is a National Highway of India. It runs from Kohima, the capital of the state of Nagaland and ends at Jhanji in the state of Assam.

Route 
 Wokha
 Mokokchung

See also
 List of National Highways in India (by Highway Number)
 List of National Highways in India
 National Highways Development Project

References

External links
 Old NH 61 on OpenStreetMap
  NH network map of India

61
61
National highways in India (old numbering)